Baron von Müller or Baron von Mueller can refer to:

 Ferdinand von Mueller (1825–1896), geographer and botanist
 Johann Wilhelm von Müller (1824–1866), explorer and ornithologist
 Baron Ladislaus Müller von Szentgyörgy (1855–?), diplomat